The Motu One Reserve is a nature reserve encompassing the whole of the island and reef system of Motu One in the northern Marquesas Islands.  The reserve was declared in 1992, and is the site of a large seabird rookery as well as a nesting ground for sea turtles.

References

See also
French Polynesia
Marquesan Nature Reserves

Environment of the Marquesas Islands
Nature reserves